Scharfenstein Castle, a ruined castle near the town of Kiedrich in Hesse, Germany, was part of the Bishopric of Mainz's border fortifications. It was erected in 1160 under Christian I (Archbishop of Mainz).

Notes and references

Sources and external links
Burgruine Scharfenstein auf kiedricher-geschichte in German.

Castles in Hesse
Ruined castles in Germany
Rheingau-Taunus-Kreis
Buildings and structures completed in 1160
Round towers